Lo-Ghekar Damodarkunda (earlier:Dalome) is a rural municipality situated in Mustang District of Gandaki Province of Nepal. The rural municipality is situated on the northern part of the Mustang, surrounded by Lomanthang rural municipality on the north, Barhagaun Muktichhetra on the south, Manang District on the south-east and Dolpa District on the west, north-eastern border of the rural municipality touches border with Tibet of China.

The rural municipality is divided into 5 wards. The admin center of the rural municipality is at Charang.

Charang, Surkhang and Dhami Village development committees were Incorporated while established this rural municipality. The rural municipality came into existence on 10 March 2017, fulfilling the requirement of the new Constitution of Nepal 2015, Ministry of Federal Affairs and General Administration replaced all old VDCs and Municipalities into 753 new local level bodies.

References

Rural municipalities in Mustang District
Rural municipalities of Nepal established in 2017